In the Secret Service is a 1913 American short silent Western film directed by Henry MacRae.

Cast
 Charles Bartlett 
 Phyllis Gordon as Edith
 Richard Stanton as Frank Armor (unconfirmed)
 Hoot Gibson
 Bertha Blanchard

See also
 Hoot Gibson filmography

External links
 

1913 films
1913 short films
1913 Western (genre) films
American silent short films
American black-and-white films
Films directed by Henry MacRae
Silent American Western (genre) films
1910s American films
1910s English-language films